M.A.D.E. is the third studio album by rapper Memphis Bleek. It was released by Get Low Records, Roc-A-Fella Records, and Def Jam Recordings on December 16, 2003. The album reached #35 on the Billboard 200 charts.

The first single released from the album was "Round Here" which features Southern rappers Trick Daddy and T.I. and production from Just Blaze. The second single was "Need Me In Your Life" which featured Nate Dogg.

Track listing

Samples
"I'm Back" by The New Birth
Sampled in “Roc-A-Fella/Get Low (Respect It)”
Produced by Coptic

“Pieces” by The Stylistics
From the album Round 2 (1972)
Sampled in “Everything's A Go”
Produced by Just Blaze

“Given Me Your Love” by Facts of Life
From the album Sometimes (1977)
Sampled in “Just Blaze, Bleek, & Free”
Produced by Just Blaze

“P.Y.T. (Pretty Young Thing)” by Michael Jackson
From the album Thriller (1983)
Interpolated in “I Wanna Love You”
Produced by Kanye West

“Hold It Now, Hit It” by Beastie Boys
From the album Licensed to Ill (1986)
Sampled in “Murda Murda”
Produced by Scott Storch

“I Wouldn't Change A Thing” by Coke Escovedo
From the album Comin' at Ya! (1976)
Sampled in “Do It All Again”
Produced by Zukhan

“UFO” by ESG
From the album ESG (1981)
Sampled in “1, 2 Y’all”
Produced by Shim & E Bass

Charts

Weekly charts

Year-end charts

References

2003 albums
Memphis Bleek albums
Albums produced by Scott Storch
Albums produced by Just Blaze
Albums produced by Kanye West
Def Jam Recordings albums
Roc-A-Fella Records albums